Božidar "Boško" Petrović (7 April 1911 – 12 July 1937) was a Yugoslav fighter ace of the Spanish Civil War and professional footballer.

Biography
Boško Petrović was born in Bela Palanka in the Kingdom of Serbia in 1911. After the completion of his secondary education, he attended the University of Belgrade, studying law. While a student, Petrović began his professional football career, beginning his career at FK Vojvodina in 1932. In 1934 he briefly played for SK Jugoslavija before joining BSK Beograd, the most successful football club in pre-war Yugoslavia. That same year he was on the Yugoslav national football team and played a match in Paris against the French. It was also during this time he joined the then-illegal Communist Party of Yugoslavia. After graduating from university, Petrović joined the Royal Yugoslav Air Force and was sent to Novi Sad to train as a pilot cadet. He took advantage of a trip to Paris in 1936 with his football team to test out new aircraft, including the Hawker Fury.

At the outbreak of the Spanish Civil War, Petrović chose to join the fight on the side of the Spanish Republic and made his way to Spain along with his friend Sreten Dudić under the pseudonym of Fernández García. Upon their arrival, the two pilots were sent on a 26-day training course in Albacete before being sent to the front. After participating in multiple battles, including the Siege of Madrid, Petrović was killed on 12 July 1937, the same day he received his fifth confirmed kill. Shortly after his death, his brother Dobre arrived in Spain and took his place in the squadron.

After the communists emerged victorious in Yugoslavia following World War II, the government commemorated Petrović by naming several streets after the pilot and dedicating a plaque to him in Partizan Stadium.

References

External links
 Reprezentacija.rs profile

See also
 Yugoslav volunteers in the Spanish Civil War
 List of Spanish Civil War flying aces

1911 births
1937 deaths
Spanish Civil War flying aces
Spanish military personnel of the Spanish Civil War (Republican faction)
Yugoslav people of the Spanish Civil War
Yugoslav communists
University of Belgrade alumni
Yugoslav footballers
Yugoslav aviators
Military personnel killed in the Spanish Civil War
Association footballers not categorized by position